Television in Pakistan started in 1964 and the first live transmission of Pakistan Television began on 26 November 1964, in Lahore.

History
In Pakistan Television was first introduced in an exhibition near Mazar-e-Quaid on 16 September 1955. This event was arranged by American consulate in Karachi. The idea of establishing the television industry in Pakistan was conceived by the National Education Commission with the support of President Ayub Khan. Originally a private sector project in 1961 by prominent industrialist Syed Wajjid Ali who signed a joint venture agreement with Nipon Electric Company (NEC), leading Pakistani engineer Ubaidur Rahman was appointed by Wajjid Ali to head the television project. By 1962, after a series of pilot transmission tests, the project was quickly taken over by the Ayub Khan Government in 1963 for the "greater national interest of Pakistan". President Ayub Khan re-appointed Ubaidur Rahman in 1963 under the Ministry of Information to continue with the NEC joint venture collaboration to launch Pakistan Television or PTV. The project began with a tent on the back lot of Radio Pakistan Lahore where a transmission tower and a studio were constructed. On 26 November 1964, the first official television station commenced transmission broadcasts from Lahore, followed by Dhaka in 1965 (then the capital of East Pakistan). A third centre was established in Rawalpindi-Islamabad in 1965 and the fourth in Karachi in 1966. Later centres in Peshawar and Quetta were established by 1974. PTV was given under Television Promoters Company in 1966 which was established under Ministry of Information and Broadcasting in the same year. TPC was upgraded to Pakistan Television Corp in 1967. In 1972 PTV Corporation was nationalized. Originally broadcast in black and white, PTV's experimental colour transmission began on 20 December 1976. With this new upgrade in techniques and equipment, the Pakistan Television Academy was founded and opened in 1987 to teach students who wished to work in the medium. As with the other agreement, the government financed most of the funds while the private venture capitalists offered to fund the remainder. Late 1980s morning transmission started on PTV.

In 1990, the then government launched the first semi government TV network of the country by the name of "Peoples Television Network" (PTN) under the Peoples TV Network, a wholly owned company of Shalimar Recording Company (which is Shalimar Recording and Broadcasting Company now). PTN, the wholly owned company was merged with Shalimar Recording Company in 1991 and the TV Channel PTN was renamed as Shalimar Television Network (STN). PTN/STN started from Islamabad first and then from Karachi, Lahore and by mid-1990s the network made its way to the whole of the country. STN for the first time in Pakistan started the programming of CNN International on the terrestrial beam, this was the first project of STN. Soon programs of BBC World started. In 1990, PTN under an agreement with the a private company (Inter-flow) started first ever private TV slot of Pakistan, Network Television Marketing (NTM), in this way STN's broadcast became the combination of programming of CNN, slot of NTM and limited broadcasts of programming of BBC World and German DW TV. This successfully continued till 1999. NTM came as a breath of fresh air to the Pakistani viewers due to its fresh and innovative programming.

PTV Network launched a full-scale satellite broadcasting service in 1991-1992. PTV-2, the first ever satellite channel of Pakistan started in 1992. In 1994, PTV was made part of the satellite beam along with PTV-2. PTV 2 was renamed as PTV World in 1998. PTV-2/World also enjoyed viewership on terrestrial beam. In 1998 PTV in association with a private company (Prime Entertainment Network) started PTV Prime, exclusively for European and later for American viewers. Digital TV satellite broadcasting was launched in 1999. PTV/PTV-1 got its satellite beam (independent of PTV 2/World) in 2001.

NTM went off air in 1999 due to financial losses and with that STN also shut down CNN International broadcast, and had limited programming of BBC World and DW TV in 1999. STN was taken over by PTV Network in 1999 and was given new name Channel-3 which started its transmissions on regular basis in 2000.  A satellite beam of STN/Channel-3 was also arranged.

In 2000, the then government of Pakistan opened up new ways for the media industry of Pakistan by allowing private TV channels to operate openly even to telecast their own news and current affairs content. Indus Vision (first ever private satellite channel of Pakistan) was launched in 2000. ARY Digital was launched in September 2000, Geo TV in 2002, Aaj TV in 2004 and Hum TV was launched in 2005, and the phenomenon went on.

In 2005 Channel-3 went off air and with that Shalimar Recording and Broadcasting Company renamed its TV channel to ATV (a joint venture of Shalimar Rec. & Broadcast. Co. & SSI) and ATV started its transmission as the only semi-private TV channel of Pakistan being shown on terrestrial as well as satellite beam (Now ATV is working as semi-government TV Channel as SRBC has not extended its agreement with SSI). In 2007, PTV or PTV-1 was given a new name PTV Home and PTV World went off air (PTV World restarted in 2012-13 as the only English language/pure satellite channel of Pakistan). PTV News replaced PTV World in 2007. PTV Home, PTV News (both state owned) and ATV (semi private) channels are shown on terrestrial beams along with the satellite beam. While recently started PTV Sports becomes available on terrestrial beams in place of either PTV Home or PTV News only during the important national and international sports events. PTV Prime went out of PTV's purview in 2005 as an independent Prime TV ; PTV launched an exclusive channel for Americas & Europe in 2006 i.e. PTV Global.

Notable TV networks

National Broadcasters

Currently two TV networks, working under the Ministry of Information and Broadcasting of the Federal Government are given the status of National Broadcasters.

PTV Network (PTV Corporation), The state owned TV Network: Following TV Channels are working under PTV Network
PTV Home
PTV News
PTV Global
PTV World
PTV Sports
 PTV Parliament
 PTV National
PTV Bolan
AJK TV
PTV Teleschool
Shalimar Recording and Broadcasting Company: Following TV Channel comes under SRBC
ATV

Private TV Channels

There are many privately owned television networks working. These are:
ARY Digital Network:
 ARY Digital
 ARY QTV
ARY News
ARY Musik
ARY Zindagi
Nickelodeon
ARY Digital UK
A Sports
Geo TV Network
Geo TV
Geo News
Geo Super
Geo Tez
Geo Kahani
Hum TV Network
Hum TV
Hum News
Hum Masala
Hum Sitaray
Hum Pashto 1
Indus TV Network
Indus News
 Aaj TV Network
 Aaj Entertainment
 Aaj News
 Play Entertainment
 Express TV Network
 Express Entertainment
 Express News
 Dunya TV Network
 Dunya News
 Airwaves Media/Interflow
 TV One
 News One (Pakistani TV channel)
 Waseb TV
 Leo Communications
 Filmazia
 Film World
 Filmax
 LTN Family
 Aruj
 Cartoon Network
 Samaa Network
 Samaa TV
 92 News
 Channel 24
 Public TV
 SEE TV
 Oxygene
 Apna Network
 Apna Channel
 Abb Takk
 8XM
 Jalwa
 Channel-5
 Channel-7
 Roze News
 Discover Pakistan TV
 Such TV
 Koh-e-Noor News
 Raavi TV
 KTN
 KTN Sindhi
 KTN News
 Sindh TV Network
 Sindh TV
 Sindh News
 Khyber TV Network
 AVT Khyber
 Khyber News
 K-2
 VSH
 Urdu 1
 Mashriq TV
 Afghan TV
 Rohi TV
 Dharti TV
 Mehran TV
 Kashish TV
 Virtual University of Pakistan
 VU-1
 VU-2
 VU-3
 VU-4
 Pashto 1
 H now

Distribution
In Pakistan only the national broadcasters are allowed to use terrestrial airwaves. Three free to air TV Channels are available on terrestrial beam, these are PTV Home, PTV News and ATV. PTV Sports is available in place of PTV Home or PTV News when an important match/event has to be given live coverage as PTV has the rights for sports coverage at terrestrial airwaves. Transmissions of AJK TV are available on terrestrial network in the northern areas of Azad Jammu and Kashmir only. Recently Pakistan has launched Digital terrestrial broadcast in selected areas only in collaboration with China. Through DTMB five TV channels of PTV Network, ATV and two Chinese TV Channels are available via terrestrial beam.

Many national and international channels are available via satellite. Some National TV Channels are "pay to watch". Internet Protocol TV Service is provided by Pakistan Telecommunications company limited which is of high quality and is quite popular in the urban centres. Cable TV Networks are the most famous mode of television distribution in Pakistan. No direct to home (DTH) service is available in Pakistan, though efforts are being made in this regard.

Regulation
Pakistan Electronic Media Regulatory Authority regularizes the TV Channels in Pakistan. This authority issues licences for the launch of any TV Channel in Pakistan. Above mentioned national broadcasters, i.e PTV Corp and SRBC do not come under purview of PEMRA.

Most viewed channels

See also
 List of television stations in Pakistan
 List of Urdu-language television channels
 List of Punjabi-language television channels
 List of Balochi-language television channels
 List of Pashto-language television channels
 List of Sindhi-language television channels
 List of Pakistani television serials
 Lists of television channels
 Timeline of the introduction of television in countries

References